Mykola Mykolayovych Benardos (1842–1905) was a Ukrainian inventor of Greek origin who in 1881 introduced carbon arc welding, which was the first practical arc welding method.

Biography 
Nikolay Benardos was born on July 8, 1842 in Benardosivka, Kherson Governorate, Russian Empire (now Mostove, Voznesensk Raion Mykolaiv Oblast Ukraine).

During the 1860s and 1870s he investigated the electric arc, and he worked on this in Moscow, St. Petersburg and Kineshma. Nikolay Benardos was the first to apply an electric arc to heat the edges of the steel sheets to the plastic state. He demonstrated a new way of metal compounds in Paris in 1881.

He could not stay in the capital due to his financial state of affairs and in 1899 he moved to Fastiv (now Kyiv Oblast, Ukraine).

He died at the age of 63 in Fastiv.

M. M. Benardos Museum in Pereiaslav, Ukraine 
The museum was established in Pereiaslav (Ukraine) in 1981 to commemorate 100 years after inventing the Elektrogefest. The museum consists of five rooms: a study, living room, workshop, laboratory and the exhibition hall.

References

External links 
 Biography of Benardos by A. A. Chekanov 
 Benardos Nikolay Nikolayevich at weldworld.ru 
 БЕНАРДОС Микола Миколайович 

1842 births
1905 deaths
Inventors from the Russian Empire